Lauter is a surname. Notable people with the surname include:

Ants Lauter (1894–1973), Estonian actor
Ed Lauter (born 1940), American actor
Estée Lauder (person) (1906–2004; originally Lauter), American businesswoman
Harry Lauter (1914–1990), American actor
Kristin Lauter, American mathematician and cryptographer
Margarete Lauter, (1925–2004), German art dealer
Rolf Lauter, (born 1952), German art historian and curator